Ted Wilde (December 16, 1889 – December 17, 1929) was a comedy writer and director during the era of silent movies, though he also directed two talkies released in 1930. He was born in New York City. His initial career was as a member of Harold Lloyd's writing staff. His final film as a director was Clancy in Wall Street. He died of a stroke in Hollywood at the age of 40, and was interred in the Forest Lawn Memorial Park Cemetery in Glendale, California.

Awards
At the 1st Academy Awards on May 16, 1929, Wilde was nominated as Best Director of a Comedy Picture for the film Speedy, but lost to Lewis Milestone for Two Arabian Knights.

Filmography
 The Battling Orioles (1924)
 The Goofy Age (1924)
 A Sailor Papa (1925)
 The Haunted Honeymoon (1925)
 The Kid Brother (1927)
 Babe Comes Home (1927)
 Speedy (1928)
 Loose Ankles (1930)
 Clancy in Wall Street (1930)

References

External links 

 

1889 births
1929 deaths
Writers from New York City
American male screenwriters
Burials at Forest Lawn Memorial Park (Glendale)
Film directors from New York City
Screenwriters from New York (state)
20th-century American male writers
20th-century American screenwriters